This is a list of foreign ministers in 2021.

Africa
  – 
Sabri Boukadoum (2019–2021)
Ramtane Lamamra (2021–present)
  – Tete António (2020–present)
  – Aurélien Agbénonci (2016–present)
  – Lemogang Kwape (2020–present)
  – 
Alpha Barry (2016–2021)
Rosine Sori-Coulibaly (2021–2021)
  – Albert Shingiro (2020–present)
  - Lejeune Mbella Mbella (2015–present)
  –
Luís Felipe Tavares (2016–2021)
Rui Figueiredo Soares (2021–present)
  – Sylvie Baïpo-Temon (2018–present)
  – 
Amine Abba Sidick (2020–2021)
Mahamat Zene Cherif (2021–present)
  – Dhoihir Dhoulkamal (2020–present)
  – Jean-Claude Gakosso (2015–present)
  – 
Marie Tumba Nzeza (2019–2021)
Christophe Lutundula (2021–present)
  – Mahamoud Ali Youssouf (2005–present)
  – Sameh Shoukry (2014–present)
  – Simeón Oyono Esono Angue (2018–present)
  – Osman Saleh Mohammed (2007–present)
  – Demeke Mekonnen (2020–present)
  – Pacôme Moubelet Boubeya (2020–2022)
  – Mamadou Tangara (2018–present)
  – Shirley Ayorkor Botchway (2017–present)
  –
Mamadi Touré (2017–2021)
Ibrahima Khalil Kaba (2021)
Morissanda Kouyaté (2021–present)
  – Suzi Barbosa (2020–present)
  – 
Ally Coulibaly (2020–2021)
Kandia Camara (2021–present)
  – Raychelle Omamo (2020–present)
  – 'Matšepo Ramakoae (2020–present)
  – Dee-Maxwell Saah Kemayah, Sr (2020–present)

Government of House of Representatives of Libya (Government of Libya internationally recognized to 2016) – Abdulhadi Elhweg (2019–2021)
 Government of National Accord of Libya (Interim government internationally recognized as the sole legitimate government of Libya from 2016) – Mohamed Taha Siala (2016–2021)
Government of National Unity of Libya – Najla Mangoush (2021–present)
  – 
Djacoba Liva Tehindrazanarivelo (2020–2021)
Patrick Rajoelina (2021–2022)
  – Eisenhower Mkaka (2020–2022)
  – 
Zeïni Moulaye (2020–2021)
Abdoulaye Diop (2021–present)
  – Ismail Ould Cheikh Ahmed (2018–present)
  – 
Nando Bodha (2019–2021)
Alan Ganoo (2021–present)
  – Nasser Bourita (2017–present)
  – Verónica Macamo (2020–present)
  – Netumbo Nandi-Ndaitwah (2012–present)
  – 
Marou Amadou (acting) (2020–2021)
Hassoumi Massoudou (2021–present)
  – Geoffrey Onyeama (2015–present)
  – Vincent Biruta (2019–present)
  – Mohamed Salem Ould Salek (1998–2023)
  – Edite Tenjua (2020–present)
  – Aïssata Tall Sall (2020–present)
  – Sylvestre Radegonde (2020–present)
  – 
Nabeela Tunis (2019–2021)
David J. Francis (2021–present)
  – 
Mohamed Abdirizak Mohamud (2020–2021)
Abdisaid Muse Ali (2021–present)
  – Essa Kayd (2020–present)
  – Naledi Pandor (2019–present)
  – 
Beatrice Wani-Noah (2020–2021)
Mayiik Ayii Deng (2021–present)
  – 
Omer Ismail (acting) (2020–2021)
Mariam al-Mahdi (2021)
Abdalla Omar Bashir (acting) (2021–2022)
  – Thuli Dladla (2018–present)
  – 
Palamagamba John Aidan Mwaluko Kabudi (2019–2021)
Liberata Mulamula (2021–present)
  – Robert Dussey (2013–present)
  – Othman Jerandi (2020–present)
  – 
Sam Kutesa (2005–2021)
Jeje Odongo (2021–present)
  – 
Joe Malanji (2018–2021)
Stanley Kakubo (2021–present)
  – 
Sibusiso Moyo (2017–2021)
Amon Murwira (acting) (2021)
Frederick Shava (2021–present)

Asia
  – 
Daur Kove (2016–2021)
Inal Ardzinba (2021–present)
 Afghanistan
  – Mohammad Hanif Atmar (2020–2021)
  – Amir Khan Muttaqi (acting) (2021–present)
  – 
Ara Ayvazyan (2020–2021)
Armen Gevondyan (acting) (2021)
Armen Grigoryan (acting) (2021)
Ararat Mirzoyan (2021–present)
  –
Masis Mayilyan (2017–2021)
David Babayan (2021–present)
  – Jeyhun Bayramov (2020–present)
  – Abdullatif bin Rashid Al Zayani (2020–present)
  – Abulkalam Abdul Momen (2019–present)
  – Tandi Dorji (2018–present)
  – Hassanal Bolkiah (2015–present)
  – Prak Sokhonn (2016–present)
  – Wang Yi (2013–present)
  – Adaljíza Magno (2020–present)
  – Davit Zalkaliani (2018–present)
  – Subrahmanyam Jaishankar (2019–present)
  – Retno Marsudi (2014–present)
  – 
Mohammad Javad Zarif (2013–2021)
Hossein Amir-Abdollahian (2021–present)
  – Fuad Hussein (2020–present)
  – Safeen Muhsin Dizayee (2019–present)
  – 
Gabi Ashkenazi (2020–2021)
Yair Lapid (2021–present)
  – 
Toshimitsu Motegi (2019–2021)
Fumio Kishida (2021)
Yoshimasa Hayashi (2021–present)
  – Ayman Safadi (2017–present)
  – Mukhtar Tleuberdi (2019–present)
  – Ri Son-gwon (2020–present)
  –
Kang Kyung-wha (2017–2021)
Chung Eui-yong (2021–2022)
  – Sheikh Ahmad Nasser Al Muhammad Al Sabah (2019–present)
  –Ruslan Kazakbayev (2020–present)
  – Saleumxay Kommasith (2016–present)
  – 
Charbel Wehbe (2020–2021)
Zeina Akar (acting) (2021)
Abdallah Bou Habib (2021–present)
  – 
Hishammuddin Hussein (2020–2021)
Saifuddin Abdullah (2021–present)
  – Abdulla Shahid (2018–present) 
  – 
Nyamtseren Enkhtaivan (2020–2021)
Batmunkh Battsetseg (2021–present)
 
 –
Aung San Suu Kyi (2016–2021)
Wunna Maung Lwin (2021–present)
 National Unity Government of Myanmar (body claiming to be the legitimate government of Myanmar (Burma), existing in parallel with State Administration Council military junta) - Zin Mar Aung (2021–present)
  – 
Pradeep Gyawali (2018–2021)
Raghubir Mahaseth (2021)
KP Sharma Oli (2021)
Sher Bahadur Deuba (2021)
Narayan Khadka (2021–present)
  – Sayyid Badr bin Hamad bin Hamood Al Busaidi (2020–present)
  – Shah Mehmood Qureshi (2018–present)
  – Riyad al-Maliki (2007–present)
  – Teodoro Locsin Jr. (2018–2022)
  – Sheikh Mohammed bin Abdulrahman Al Thani (2016–present)

  – Prince Faisal bin Farhan Al Saud (2019–present)
  – Vivian Balakrishnan (2015–present)
  – Dmitry Medoyev (2017–present)
  – 
Dinesh Gunawardena (2019–2021)
Gamini Lakshman Peiris (2021–present)
  – Faisal Mekdad (2020–present)
  – Joseph Wu (2018–present)
  – Sirodjidin Aslov (2013–present)
  – Don Pramudwinai (2015–present)
  – Mevlüt Çavuşoğlu (2015–present)
  – Raşit Meredow (2001–present)
  – Sheikh Abdullah bin Zayed Al Nahyan (2006–present)
  – Abdulaziz Komilov (2012–present)
  – 
Phạm Bình Minh (2011–2021)
Bùi Thanh Sơn (2021–present)

Republic of Yemen – Ahmad Awad Bin Mubarak (2020–present)
Supreme Political Council (unrecognised, rival government) – Hisham Abdullah (2016–present)

Europe
  – Olta Xhaçka (2020–present)
  – Maria Ubach i Font (2017–present)
  – 
Alexander Schallenberg (2019–2021)
Michael Linhart (2021)
Alexander Schallenberg (2021–present)
 Belarus
  – Vladimir Makei (2012–present)
 National Anti-Crisis Management (‘Shadow-government-like" organisation) - Anatoly Kotov (2020–present)
  – Sophie Wilmès (2020–present)
  - Pascal Smet (2019–present)
  - Jan Jambon (2019–present)
  Wallonia - Elio Di Rupo (2019–present)
  – Bisera Turković (2019–present)
  – 
Ekaterina Zakharieva (2017–2021)
Svetlan Stoev (2021)
Teodora Genchovska (2021–present)
  – Gordan Grlić-Radman (2019–present)
  – Nikos Christodoulides (2018–2022)
  – 
Tomáš Petříček (2018–2021)
Jan Hamáček (acting) (2021)
Jakub Kulhánek (2021)
Jan Lipavský (2021–present)
  – Jeppe Kofod (2019–present)
  – Jenis av Rana (2019–present)
  Donetsk People's Republic – Natalya Nikonorova (2016–present)
  –
Urmas Reinsalu (2019–2021)
Eva-Maria Liimets (2021–present)
  – Pekka Haavisto (2019–present)
  – Jean-Yves Le Drian (2017–present)
  – 
Heiko Maas (2018–2021)
Annalena Baerbock (2021–present)
  – Nikos Dendias (2019–present)
  – Jonathan Le Tocq (2016–present)
  – Péter Szijjártó (2014–present)
  – 
Guðlaugur Þór Þórðarson (2017–2021)
Þórdís Kolbrún R. Gylfadóttir (2021–present)
  – Simon Coveney (2017–present)
  – Luigi Di Maio (2019–present)
  – Ian Gorst (2018–present)
  – 
Meliza Haradinaj-Stublla (2020–2021)
Besnik Tahirij (2021)
Donika Gërvalla-Schwarz (2021–present)
  – Edgars Rinkēvičs (2011–present)
  – 
Katrin Eggenberger (2019–2021)
Dominique Hasler (2021–present)
  – Gabrielius Landsbergis (2020–present)
  Lugansk People's Republic – Vladislav Deinevo (2017–present)
  – Jean Asselborn (2004–present)
  – Bujar Osmani (2020–present)
  – Evarist Bartolo (2020–present)
  – 
Aureliu Ciocoi (2020–2021)
Nicu Popescu (2021–present)
  Gagauzia – Vitaliy Vlah (2015–present)
  – Laurent Anselmi (2019–2022)
  – Đorđe Radulović (2020–present)
  – 
Stef Blok (2018–2021)
Sigrid Kaag (2021)
Tom de Bruijn (acting) (2021)
Ben Knapen (2021–2022)
  – Tahsin Ertuğruloğlu (2020–2022)
  – 
Ine Marie Eriksen Søreide (2017–2021)
Anniken Huitfeldt (2021–present)
  – Zbigniew Rau (2020–present)
  – Augusto Santos Silva (2015–2022)
  – Bogdan Aurescu (2019–present)
  – Sergey Lavrov (2004–present)
  – Luca Beccari (2020–present)
  – Nikola Selaković (2020–present)
  – 
Ivan Korčok (2020–2021)
Jaroslav Naď (acting) (2021)
Ivan Korčok (2021–present)
  – Anže Logar (2020–present)
  – 
Arancha González Laya (2020–2021)
José Manuel Albares (2021–present)
  – Paula Fernández Viaña (2019–present)
  – 
Bernat Solé (2020–2021)
Victòria Alsina Burgués (2021–present)
  – Ann Linde (2019–present)
  – Ignazio Cassis (2017–present)
  – Vitaly Ignatyev (2015–present)

  – Dmytro Kuleba (2020–present)
  - 
Dominic Raab (2019–2021)
Liz Truss (2021–present)
  – 
Michael Russell (2020-2021)
Angus Robertson (2021-present)
  – Archbishop Paul Gallagher (2014–present)

North America and the Caribbean
  – E.P. Chet Greene (2018–present)
  – 
Darren Henfield (2017–2021)
Fred Mitchell (2021–present)
  – Jerome Walcott (2018–present)
  – Eamon Courtenay (2020–present)
  – 
François-Philippe Champagne (2019–2021)
Marc Garneau (2021)
Mélanie Joly (2021–present)
  Quebec – Nadine Girault (2018–present)
  – Rodolfo Solano (2020–present)
  – Bruno Rodríguez Parrilla (2009–present)
  – Kenneth Darroux (2019–present)
  – Roberto Álvarez (2020–present)
  – Alexandra Hill Tinoco (2019–present)
  Greenland – 
Steen Lynge (2020–2021)
Kim Kielsen (2021)
Pele Broberg (2021)
Múte Bourup Egede (2021–present)
  – Oliver Joseph (2020–present)
 – Pedro Brolo (2020–2022)
  – 
Claude Joseph (2020–2021)
Jean Victor Généus (2021–present)
  – Lisandro Rosales (2019–2022)
  – Kamina Johnson-Smith (2016–present)
  – Marcelo Ebrard (2018–present)
  – Denis Moncada (2017–present)
  – Erika Mouynes (2020–present)
  – 
Raúl Márquez Hernández (2020–2021)
Larry Seilhamer Rodríguez (2021)
Félix Rivera Torres (acting) (2021)
Omar Marrero Díaz (2021–present)
  – Mark Brantley (2015–present)
  – 
Allen Chastanet (2016–2021)
Alva Baptiste (2021–present)
  – Ralph Gonsalves (2020–present)
  – Amery Browne (2020–present)
  –
Mike Pompeo (2018–2021)
Daniel Smith (acting) (2021)
Antony Blinken (2021–present)

Oceania
  – Marise Payne (2018–present)
  – Mark Brown (2013–present)
  – Frank Bainimarama (2020–present)
   – Édouard Fritch (2014–present)
  – Taneti Mamau (2016–present)
  – Casten Nemra (2020–present)
  – Kandhi A. Elieisar (2019–present)
  – Lionel Aingimea (2019–present)
  – Nanaia Mahuta (2020–present)
  – Dalton Tagelagi (2020–present)
  – 
Faustina Rehuher-Marugg (2017–2021)
Uduch Sengebau Senior (2021)
Gustav Aitaro (2021–present)
  – Soroi Eoe (2020–2022)
  –
Tuilaepa Aiono Sailele Malielegaoi (1998–2021)
Naomi Mataʻafa (2021–present)
  – Jeremiah Manele (2019–present)
  – 
Fofo Tuisano (2020–2021)
Kelihiano Kalolo (2021–present)
  – 
Pohiva Tu'i'onetoa (2019–2021)
Fekitamoeloa ʻUtoikamanu (2021–present)
  – Simon Kofe (2019–present)
  – Mark Ati (2020–present)

South America
  – 
Felipe Solá (2019–2021)
Santiago Cafiero (2021–present)
  – Rogelio Mayta (2020–present)
  – 
Ernesto Araújo (2019–2021)
Carlos Alberto França (2021–present)
  - Andrés Allamand (2020–2022)
  – 
Claudia Blum (2019–2021)
Adriana Mejía (acting) (2021)
Marta Lucía Ramírez (2021–2022)
  – 
Luis Gallegos (2020–2021)
Manuel Mejía Dalmau (2021)
Mauricio Montalvo Samaniego (2021–2022)
  – Hugh Todd (2020–present)
  – 
Federico González Franco (2020–2021)
Euclides Acevedo (2021–present)
  –
Elizabeth Astete (2020–2021)
Allan Wagner Tizón (2021)
Héctor Béjar (2021)
Óscar Maúrtua (2021–2022)
  – Albert Ramdin (2020–present)
  – Francisco Bustillo (2020–present)
  – 
Jorge Arreaza (2017–2021)
Félix Plasencia (2021–present)

See also

List of current foreign ministers

References

Foreign ministers
2021 in international relations
Foreign ministers
2021